St. Patrick Academy is a private, Roman Catholic, coeducational high school in Providence, Rhode Island.  It is located in the Roman Catholic Diocese of Providence.

Background
Originally established as an all-boy school in 1843, St. Patrick Academy was reestablished as a high school in 2009 after closing the associated elementary school grades 1–5.  The original high school was first established in 1933 and closed in 1970.  It is the oldest Catholic school in Rhode Island.

Notes and references

Catholic secondary schools in Rhode Island
Schools in Providence County, Rhode Island
1843 establishments in Rhode Island
Roman Catholic Diocese of Providence
Educational institutions established in 1843